The 2018 season will be V-Varen Nagasaki's first season in the J1 League after earning promotion from the J2 League in 2017.

Background

V-Varen Nagasaki had finished the previous season in second place and thus earned promotion to the pinnacle of Japanese football, the J1 League. This will be their first ever season competing in the J1 League. The club's first move in preparation for the upcoming season was the signing of experienced FC Tokyo right wingback Yūhei Tokunaga. A couple days later would see the departures of goalkeeper Yuya Miura and midfielder Kenta Furube, while right back Yusuke Murakami retired. On 11 December 2017 it was announced that midfielder Mitsuru Maruoka would return to Cerezo Osaka once his loan concludes in January.

On 22 December, Nagasaki bolstered their attack with the signing of forward Musashi Suzuki from Albirex Niigata. Three days later it was announced that Masato Kurogi, a midfielder from Ventforet Kofu who had already played for Nagasaki in 2014 and 2015, would return to the club. The next day the club announced three signings, including the signing of two goalkeepers: Kenta Tokushige from Vissel Kobe and Takuya Masuda, Nagasaki's starting goalkeeper from 2017 returning to the club on an extended loan from Sanfrecce Hiroshima. Forward Shu Hiramatsu also returned to the club on loan from Albirex Niigata. Again, the next day, the club announced that Spanish midfielder Miguel Pallardó would leave the club.

Squad movement

In

Out

Player statistics
Key

No. = Squad number

Pos = Playing position

Nat. = Nationality

Apps = Appearances

GK = Goalkeeper

DF = Defender

MF = Midfielder

FW = Forward

 = Yellow cards

 = Red cards

Numbers in parentheses denote appearances as substitute. Players with name struck through and marked  left the club during the playing season.

See also
 2018 in Japanese football
 2018 J1 League

References

V-Varen Nagasaki
V-Varen Nagasaki seasons